Kırkikievler railway station was a railway station in İzmit, Turkey. It was serviced by the Adapazarı Express regional train service from Istanbul to Adapazarı. Located just south of the city center, the station was originally built in 1975 by the Turkish State Railways, when the Istanbul-Ankara railway was realigned to bypass İzmit's city center.

Kırkikievler station was closed down on 1 February 2012 due to construction of the Ankara-Istanbul high-speed railway.

References

External links
TCDD Taşımacılık

Railway stations in Kocaeli Province
Railway stations opened in 1975
1975 establishments in Turkey
Railway stations closed in 2012
2012 disestablishments in Turkey